The 2021–22 season is the 144th season of competitive association football and ninth season in the Scottish Professional Football League played by Kilmarnock Football Club, a professional football club based in Kilmarnock, Ayrshire, Scotland. Their 11th-place finish and play-off defeat in 2020–21 meant it was their first season in the Championship and their first in the second tier of Scottish football since 1992–93. The 2020–21 season ran from 1 July 2021 to 30 June 2022.

Tommy Wright made 14 permanent summer signings as he approached his first full season as Kilmarnock manager. In December 2020, Wright was sacked with Kilmarnock fifth in the table, following three consecutive league defeats. He was replaced by former Aberdeen manager Derek McInnes in January 2022. Following an upturn in form, Kilmarnock climbed the table and earned promotion back to the Premiership at the first time of asking after claiming the league title following a 2–1 comeback win against nearest challengers Arbroath in their penultimate match. It was their first second tier title since 1898–99.

In cup competition, Kilmarnock were eliminated in the fourth round of the Scottish Cup, in the second round of the League Cup and the semifinals of the Challenge Cup.

In total, 36 players made at least one appearance in nationally organised first-team competition and there have been 18 different goalscorers. Midfielder Fraser Murray missed only five of the 47 first-team matches over the season. Oli Shaw was the leading scorer with 16 goals, of which 14 came in league competition and two came in the Challenge Cup.

Overview
Tommy Wright signed a two-year contract in February 2021 to become the Kilmarnock manager.

In the League Cup, Kilmarnock were drawn in Group G alongside East Kilbride, Clyde, Greenock Morton and Stranraer. The competition is scheduled to start on 10 July 2021.

On 18 December 2021, Tommy Wright was sacked from his position as manager with the club slipping to fourth in the championship table.

On 4 January 2022, former Aberdeen manager Derek McInnes was appointed as the club's new manager on on an 18-month contract.

Results and fixtures

Pre-season

Scottish Championship

Notes

Scottish Cup

Scottish League Cup

Notes

Scottish Challenge Cup

Club statistics

Competition Overview

League table

League Cup table

Squad statistics

Transfers

Transfers in

Transfers out

References

Kilmarnock F.C. seasons
Kilmarnock